Yeshajahu Pomeranz (1922–1995) was an Israeli-American food scientist.

Early life and education
Pomeranz was born on 28 November 1922 in Poland to Rysia (née Bildner) and Dovid Pomeranz. He received bachelor's degrees from the Israel Institute of Technology in chemistry and chemical engineering in 1944 and 1945. He obtained a master's degree in chemical engineering from the University of London, and a doctorate in grain science and milling from Kansas State University.

Career

In 1982 he received a grant from the Alexander von Humboldt Foundation to conduct research in West Germany. He was editor-in-chief of Cereal Chemistry from 1985 to 1992.

Personal life and death
Pomeranz married an elementary school teacher from Israel and had two sons. He died of brain cancer on 21 July 1995, aged 72.

Awards and honours
 Wiley Award (1980) from the Association of Official Analytical Chemists
 Thomas Burr Osborne Medal (1980) and William F. Geddes Memorial Award (1982) from the American Association of Cereal Chemists
 USDA Distinguished Service Award (1983)
 Award for advancement of application of agricultural and food chemistry (1984) from the Agriculture and Food Division of the American Chemical Society

Selected publications

Books

Articles

References 

1922 births
1995 deaths
Polish emigrants to Israel
20th-century Israeli scientists
Alumni of the University of London
Technion – Israel Institute of Technology alumni
Academic journal editors
Kansas State University alumni